Sanusi Turay (born 14 April 1968) is a retired Sierra Leonean athlete who specialised in the sprinting events. He represented his country at the 1992 and 1996 Summer Olympics, as well as two outdoor and four indoor World Championships.

Competition record
4 x 100m relay 2nd, All African Games (Cairo 1991)
4 x 100m relay 2nd, All African Games (Harare 1995)
4 x 100m relay 3rd, World Cup in Athletics (Havana 1992)

Personal bests
Outdoor
100 metres – 10.25 (+0.7 m/s) (Athens 1996)
200 metres – 21.04 (-1.4 m/s) (Germiston, SA 1992)
Indoor
60 metres – 6.68 (San Sabastian, Spain 1993)

References

External links
All-Athletics profile

1968 births
Living people
Sierra Leonean male sprinters
Olympic athletes of Sierra Leone
Athletes (track and field) at the 1992 Summer Olympics
Athletes (track and field) at the 1996 Summer Olympics
Commonwealth Games competitors for Sierra Leone
Athletes (track and field) at the 1994 Commonwealth Games
Athletes (track and field) at the 1998 Commonwealth Games
World Athletics Championships athletes for Sierra Leone
Universiade medalists in athletics (track and field)
Universiade medalists for Sierra Leone
Medalists at the 1991 Summer Universiade
Members of Thames Valley Harriers